Aera! Aera! Aera! (En. Hero Bunker) is a 1972 Greek feature film directed by Kostas Andritsos, starring Yannis Voglis and Xenia Kalogeropoulou. The plot concerns the opening phase of the Greco-Italian War in October/November 1940, with the protagonists caught up in the Italian invasion of Greece from Albania. The film belongs to a series of "patriotic" films shot during the Greek military junta of 1967–74. Its title derives from the popular Greek war cry of the time, "Aera!".

Cast
 Giannis Voglis as Petros
 Christos Negas as Alexis
 Giannis Gionakis as Stratos
 Petros Fyssoun as Symeon
 Thanasis Mylonas as Notis
 Dimitris Bislanis as Stathis Giokas

External links

BFI database entry

1972 films
Greek war drama films
1970s Greek-language films
Greek World War II films
Greco-Italian War
Works about Greece in World War II
1970s war drama films